The Beethoven Monument (Spanish: Monumento a Beethoven) is installed in Alameda Central, Mexico City, Mexico. The memorial, designed by Theodor von Gosen, features two allegorical bronze sculptures, and was installed in 1921.

References

External links

 

1921 establishments in Mexico
1921 sculptures
Alameda Central
Allegorical sculptures
Bronze sculptures in Mexico
Monuments and memorials in Mexico City
Outdoor sculptures in Mexico City
Sculptures of Ludwig van Beethoven
Sculptures of men in Mexico
Statues in Mexico City